Moonlight on the Avenue of Faith is  the second novel from Gina B. Nahai and follows the story of Lili and her mother's mysterious disappearance. The book was published in 2000 by Washington Square Press in the United States and became a Los Angeles Times bestseller.

Plot summary
When she is five years old, Lili watches her mother, Roxanna the Angel, throw herself off the balcony of their house on the Avenue of Faith. Her family's subsequent search for her reveals no body, no sign of a fall, no trace of an escape. The only witness to Roxanna's disappearance, Lili will spend the next thirteen years looking for her mother, wondering if she is still alive and why she left.

The novel tells the life story of Roxanna, born as a “bad-luck child” in the Jewish ghetto of Tehran, through the world of Iran's aristocracy, into the whorehouses of Turkey and to Los Angeles, where she and Lili are reunited.

Reception
The book was the winner of the International Dublin Literary Award and the Harold U. Ribalow Award, and was long listed for the Orange Prize.

Critical response was mostly positive. Edward Hower, writing for The New York Times Book Review, said, "Nahai has achieved some wonderful effects, infusing everyday events with miraculous radiance.” Publishers Weekly called the story "spellbinding" and "marvelously compelling."

References

2000 American novels
American magic realism novels
Novels set in Iran
Jewish American novels
Novels by Gina B. Nahai
Washington Square Press books